The 1900–01 Cornell men's ice hockey season was the 2nd season of play for the program.

Season
Towards the end of the school year, Cornell sent an ice hockey team, under the guidance of G. A. Smith, to Philadelphia for a set of three games over four days. Cornell won each contest to finish the season undefeated, but with the small number of games they were ineligible for the collegiate championship.

G. A. Smith may be the first official head coach for any college hockey team.

Note: Cornell University did not formally adopt 'Big Red' as its moniker until after 1905. They have been, however, associated with 'Carnelian and White' since the school's Inauguration Day on October 7, 1868.

Roster

Standings

Schedule and Results

|-
!colspan=12 style=";" | Regular Season

References

Cornell Big Red men's ice hockey seasons
Cornell
Cornell
Cornell
Cornell